Vittorio Rovelli (August 16, 1916 in Renate – 1996) was an Italian professional football player.

Honours
 Serie A champion: 1939/40
 Coppa Italia winner: 1938/39

1916 births
Year of death missing
Italian footballers
Serie A players
Inter Milan players
U.S. Cremonese players
Brescia Calcio players
Alma Juventus Fano 1906 players
Pisa S.C. players
S.S. Arezzo players
L'Aquila Calcio 1927 players
Association football midfielders